Maria Sharapova was the defending champion, but could not compete due to a long-term shoulder injury.

Caroline Wozniacki beat Aleksandra Wozniak in the final, 6–1, 6–2.

Seeds

Draw

Finals

Top half

Bottom half

External links
 ITF tournament edition details

MPS Group Championships - Singles
Singles